The Columbus Motor Speedway (CMS) was a 1/3 mile asphalt oval and figure-eight racing track located south of Columbus, Ohio within the town limits of Obetz.

History 
In 1945, John Nuckles and Robert Roseberry purchased  of land for site of the future race track.  The track opened in 1946 as a dirt track for motorcycles. In 1950 the track was given lighting and in 1957, the track was paved for the first time as car racing, specifically stock car racing, became more popular. Robert Roseberry sold his portion to John Nuckles after the paving was complete. The track was run by the Nuckles for many years, and was owned and operated by the Nuckles family. Among the drivers to make their names at the CMS are Neal Sceva, Dick Freeman, Benny Parsons, and Ralph O'Day. Among those killed at Columbus Motor speedway is Bessie E. Amos.

The track was one of three tracks in Ohio to be granted a NASCAR sanctioning agreement.  It hosted Whelen All-American Series (formerly the Dodge Weekly Racing Series) races sanctioned by NASCAR. It also hosted many exhibition events, which are some of the most popular attractions, including trailer races, school bus figure-eight races, demolition derbies, "roll over" contests, monster truck stunt rallies, "powder-puff" races, and NASCAR "legends" races which feature famous Sprint Cup drivers. Due to the relatively high compensation required to secure Sprint Cup driver participation in the NASCAR "legends" races, said events were discontinued before the track was closed. In late 2016, the Nuckles Family decided to sell the track to Obetz. The Fortress Obetz now sits where the speedway was.

The speedway hosted a NASCAR K&N Pro Series East event (the NAPA 150) from 2011 through 2016. The winners of the races were notable NASCAR drivers, like Bubba Wallace, Cale Conley, Daniel Suárez, Sergio Peña, Rico Abreu and Justin Haley. Also at Columbus Motor Speedway, NASCAR Midwest Series ran a race in 2004 and was won by Justin Diercks.

ARCA Racing Series also ran two races at the track, one in 1982 and the other in 1993.

The track closed at the end of the 2016 season; the village of Obetz purchased the land from the Nuckles family in order to improve facilities for the Columbus Crew SC and a local rugby team.

2009 platform collapse
The race track made national headlines on April 11, 2009, when the concrete platform that supported the announcer's box collapsed shortly after the gate opened. One person was temporarily stuck in the rubble and six people suffered minor injuries at the season-opening event. Local rescue workers were called to the scene and the events were canceled for the evening. After the incident, the platform was repaired and reinforced.

Sources 

Columbus Motor Speedway at cityguide, Retrieved June 23, 2007
Columbus Motor Speedway at na-motorsports.com, Retrieved June 23, 2007

External links

Columbus Motor Speedway race results at Racing-Reference

Buildings and structures in Franklin County, Ohio
Motorsport venues in Ohio
NASCAR tracks
ARCA Menards Series tracks
Tourist attractions in Franklin County, Ohio
Defunct motorsport venues in the United States
1946 establishments in Ohio
2016 disestablishments in Ohio
Demolished sports venues in Ohio